Saharat Kaewsangsai (born 8 July 1994) is a professional footballer from Thailand for Chiangmai United in Thai League 2.

References

External links
 

1994 births
Living people
Saharat Kaewsangsai
Saharat Kaewsangsai
Association football defenders
Saharat Kaewsangsai
Saharat Kaewsangsai
Saharat Kaewsangsai
Saharat Kaewsangsai